Stéphanie is the second and final studio album released by Princess Stéphanie of Monaco. The album was released on 30 July 1991 through the WTG Records in the United States, and the Epic Records in Europe. It was released five years after her successful debut album Besoin. Stéphanie met with disappointing sales — it sold only 3,500 copies in the United States — and negative reviews. In 1992, Stéphanie ended her music career.

Album information 
In 1987, after the release of her successful debut album Besoin, Stéphanie moved to Los Angeles, California due to a further development of her music career. She signed a record contract with the Sony Music, and released Stéphanie through their label WTG Records. Epic Records released the album in Europe. While her previous album featured Europop and eurodance songs, Stéphanie experimented with pop rock and electronic music on Stéphanie. Stéphanie and her producer Ron Bloom wrote all the songs, all in English language. Michael Verdick and Bloom produced most of the songs.

Singles and promotion 
The album's lead single "Winds of Chance" was released in 1991, with the accompanying music video shot in the Canary Islands. However, the single was not commercially successful, failing to mirror singles from Stéphanie's previous album Besoin. In summer 1991, Stéphanie launched her first world tour, throughout Europe and South America, in order to promote Stéphanie. Despite the tour being rather successful, the album did not achieve commercial success. the second single was "You Don't Die from Love".

Reception 
Stéphanie received mixed reviews from music critics. Dave Obee from Calgary Herald felt that her first North American single, "Winds of Chance" is the "weakest song" on the album, adding, "But give the princess a chance, and you'll discover she delivers top-notch pop with a strong, personal lyrical punch. You'll find yourself checking the label - and discovering that Stephanie co-wrote nine of the 10 songs. It would be easy to dismiss Stephanie as a spoiled royal brat indulging herself, but that's not fair. She may not be the queen of pop, but she's a serious contender." Pan-European magazine Music & Media commented, "Even princesses embark on careers in show business. No problem for Stephanie, it runs in the royal family of Monaco. This highly commercial pop/disco debut album will definitely put the crown on her work." David Hiltbrand of People wrote, "This isn't a humiliating outing. But it sure is embarrassing. Oh, Steph hits all the notes but, unfortunately, without any conviction or depth".

Track listing

Personnel 
 Princess Stéphanie of Monaco – vocals, songwriter
 Ron Bloom – guitar, keyboard, percussion, synthesizer, arranging, mixing
 David Coleman – art direction
 Kristen Connolly – engineering
 Linda Harmon – backing vocals
 Mary Hylan – backing vocals
 Linda Mallah – backing vocals
 Brian McHugh – engineering
 Michael Miller – photography
 David Mitson – mastering
 Guy Snider – engineering
 Michael Verdick – mixing, producing

Charts

See also 
 1991 in music
 Besoin
 Princess Stéphanie of Monaco

References

External links 
 Stéphanie at the Amazon.com

1991 albums
Princess Stéphanie of Monaco albums